A calzone ("stocking" or "trouser") is an Italian oven-baked folded pizza, often described as a turnover, made with leavened dough. It originated in Naples in the 18th century. A typical calzone is made from salted bread dough, baked in an oven and is stuffed with salami, ham or vegetables, mozzarella, ricotta and Parmesan or pecorino cheese, as well as an egg. Different regional variations in or on a calzone can often include other ingredients that are normally associated with pizza toppings. The term usually applies to an oven-baked turnover rather than a fried pastry (i.e. panzerotti), though calzoni and panzerotti are often mistaken for each other.

A stromboli, an Italian-American pizza turnover is similar to a Calzone, and the two are sometimes confused. Unlike strombolis, which are generally rolled or folded into a cylindrical or rectangular shape, calzones are always folded into a crescent shape, and typically do not contain tomato sauce inside.

Regional variations

In Italy
Sandwich-sized calzones are often sold at Italian lunch counters or by street vendors, because they are easy to eat while standing or walking. Fried versions of the calzone are typically filled with tomato and mozzarella: these are made in Apulia and are called panzerotti. 

In Basilicata, a variety of calzone is known as pastizz, which originated between the 18th and 19th century. Pork (or, more rarely, goat meat), eggs and cheese are main ingredients for the filling.

The Sicilian cuddiruni or cudduruni pizza is distantly related to the calzone.  This is a dish stuffed with onions (or sometimes other vegetables, such as potatoes or broccoli), anchovies, olives, cheese and mortadella; the rolled pizza dough is folded in two over the stuffing and the edges are sealed before the dish is fried.

In the United States
In the United States, calzones are typically made from pizza dough and stuffed with meats, cheeses, and vegetables. 

Traditional calzone dough, consisting of flour, yeast, olive oil, water, and salt, is kneaded and rolled into medium-sized disks.
Each is then filled with cheeses such as ricotta, mozzarella, Parmesan, provolone, and other traditional vegetables or meats. The dough is then folded in half over the filling and sealed with an egg mixture in a half-moon shape, or is sometimes shaped into a ball by pinching and sealing all the edges at the top. It is then either baked or fried. 

In some areas, just before serving, they are topped with marinara or other traditional sauce, or with a mixture of garlic, olive oil, and parsley.

Cultural notes
In Italy, as of the 1960s, calzones were popularly believed to be the most efficient type of pizza for home delivery.

See also

 List of Italian dishes
 Empanada
 Panzerotti
 U' pastizz 'rtunnar
 Pastel
 Pepperoni roll
 Pizza puff
 Scacciata
 Stromboli

References

Bibliography

Italian cuisine
Neapolitan cuisine
Italian-American cuisine
Savoury pies
Pizza styles

Stuffed dishes
Street food in Italy